Reiszia is an extinct genus of therapsids from European Russia belonging to the family Nikkasauridae.

Taxonomy
Two species are known, Reiszia gubini and R. tippula, both found in middle Permian sediments in the Mezen River Basin of European Russia. R. gubini is known from a partial skull and mandible, while R. tippula is known only from a mandible.

See also

 List of therapsids

References

 Kemp, Thomas Stainforth (2005). The Origin and Evolution of Mammals. .

Biarmosuchians
Guadalupian synapsids of Europe
Fossil taxa described in 2000
Prehistoric therapsid genera